Urko Vera Mateos (born 14 May 1987) is a Spanish professional footballer who plays for Santutxu FC as a centre-forward.

Club career
Born in Barakaldo, Biscay, Vera played mostly amateur football until the age of 23, having represented Basque giants Athletic Bilbao as a youth from ages 10–12. During his spell at SD Lemona, he received part of his wage by taking the team's kits to the laundry.

In the last minutes of the 2011 January transfer window, after impressing with Lemona in Segunda División B (the club was coached by legendary Athletic player Aitor Larrazábal), Vera was acquired by the Lions, signing a one 1/2-year contract and initially being assigned to the reserve side, Bilbao Athletic. He made his first-team – and La Liga – debut on 5 February, coming on as a substitute for Iker Muniain for the final 15 minutes of a 3–0 home win against Sporting de Gijón.

On 14 March 2011, again appearing from the bench, Vera scored his first goal for Athletic Bilbao, heading home in injury time in a 2–2 draw at Getafe CF. After being released he resumed his career in Segunda División, representing five clubs in just four years, including CD Mirandés for which he netted 20 times in all competitions.

Vera moved to Jeonbuk Hyundai Motors FC in the K League 1 in late July 2015. On 10 January of the following year, he returned to his country and joined CA Osasuna in the second level.

On 19 August 2016, Vera signed a one-year deal with SD Huesca, still in the second tier. The following 23 January, he returned to Mirandés after leaving by mutual consent.

On 18 May 2017, Vera moved to Romania with CFR Cluj. In January 2019, after a short loan spell at FC Astra Giurgiu also in the country's Liga I, he signed with English League Two club Oldham Athletic. His contract at the latter was mutually terminated on 24 January 2020, and he returned to the Spanish lower leagues shortly after with CD Guijuelo. 

Vera returned to his native region on 28 August 2020, with the 33-year-old agreeing to a deal at third-tier Club Portugalete.

Honours
Eibar
Segunda División: 2013–14

Jeonbuk Hyundai
K League 1: 2015

CFR Cluj
Liga I: 2017–18, 2018–19
Supercupa României: 2018

Notes

References

External links

1987 births
Living people
Spanish footballers
Footballers from Barakaldo
Association football forwards
La Liga players
Segunda División players
Segunda División B players
Tercera División players
Tercera Federación players
Santutxu FC players
CD Laudio players
Club Portugalete players
SD Eibar footballers
SD Lemona footballers
Bilbao Athletic footballers
Athletic Bilbao footballers
Hércules CF players
SD Ponferradina players
AD Alcorcón footballers
CD Mirandés footballers
CA Osasuna players
SD Huesca footballers
CD Guijuelo footballers
K League 1 players
Jeonbuk Hyundai Motors players
Liga I players
CFR Cluj players
FC Astra Giurgiu players
English Football League players
Oldham Athletic A.F.C. players
Spanish expatriate footballers
Expatriate footballers in South Korea
Expatriate footballers in Romania
Expatriate footballers in England
Spanish expatriate sportspeople in South Korea
Spanish expatriate sportspeople in Romania
Spanish expatriate sportspeople in England